The first decorative fountain in the United States was dedicated in Philadelphia in 1809. Early American fountains were used to distribute clean drinking water, had little ornamentation, and copied European styles.

In the 20th century, American fountains ceased to distribute drinking water; they became purely decorative, and were designed to honor events or individuals, as works of urban sculpture or to imitate nature.

A notable, albeit widely unknown exception (even locally) is the Tyler Davidson Fountain in the city centre of Cincinnati, which has never ceased maintenance of its filtration and treatment accessories that are housed in the four waterspout figures on the structures perimeter. These waterspouts initially provided a very reliable and trustworthy source of potable water to the urban workforce, and though demand has lessened, the local Water Works continues its upkeep, perhaps informed by the fountain's allegorical design highlighting water as no less fickle than fundamental.

In the late 20th century, the musical fountain, where the dance of water is controlled by a computer and is accompanied by lights and music, became a form of public entertainment in Las Vegas and other American cities.

1800-1900 

Philadelphia built the first citywide water system in the United States, which began operation in January 1801. Underground aqueducts carried drinking water from the Schuylkill River, and twin steam pumps propelled it into a water tower at Centre Square, now the site of Philadelphia City Hall. Scottish-born architect Benjamin Henry Latrobe designed the system along with the Greek Revival pumping house/water tower. Centre Square was converted from a meadow into a public park, and an ornamental fountain was added, 1808–1809. Sculptor William Rush carved a wooden statue, Allegory of the Schuylkill River (better known as Water Nymph with Bittern), to adorn the Centre Square fountain.

The first monumental fountains in the United States were built to mark the termini of aqueducts bringing fresh drinking water into New York City. A cholera epidemic in 1832 and the disastrous Great Fire of New York, in 1835, persuaded the government of New York City to build the Croton aqueduct to bring abundant fresh water into the city. The Croton Dam, aqueduct, and reservoir were finished in 1841, bringing water 40 miles from the Croton River to New York City. In commemoration, the Croton Fountain in City Hall Park, was turned on on October 14, 1842, and jetted water 50 feet into the air.  A second fountain in Union Square was also connected to the system.

The first fountains were very simple, without sculpture, and simply spouted water up into the air. They no longer exist, though vestiges of the original water system remain.

In 1848, Boston completed its own new water system, an aqueduct from Lake Cochituate  to the Boston Common, where the first fountain was located. A parade and festival were held to mark the fountain's opening on October 25, 1848. The ceremony included schoolchildren singing an ode written by American poet James Russell Lowell for the event. The ode began:

"My name is Water: I have sped
through strange dark ways untried before,
By pure desire of friendship led,
Cochituate's Ambassador:
He sends four gifts by me,
Long life, health, peace, and purity."

In contrast to the first American fountains, which were simple and functional, in the 1850s, more decorative fountains were constructed as part of a nationwide effort to beautify American cities by building parks, squares, and fountains inspired by European models. 

For example, the Bethesda Fountain was created to adorn New York City's new Central Park, which project had been begun in 1858 by Frederick Law Olmsted and Calvert Vaux, to create a vast natural landscape in the heart of the city. In the middle of the park was one formal element: a mall adorned with elm trees and a terrace with views over a lake. In 1863, the park commissioners decided to build a monumental fountain for the central basin in the middle of the mall. The sculptor was a little-known American artist, Emma Stebbins, whose brother was the head of the New York Stock Exchange and President of the Board of Commissioners, who lobbied on her behalf. Her fountain was based on the biblical verse from the Gospel of Saint John, in which an angel touched, or "troubled", the waters of the Pool of Bethesda in Jerusalem, giving it healing powers. She wrote about the fountain:  "We have no less healing, comfort and purification freely sent to us through the blessed gift of pure, wholesome water, which to all the countless homes of this great city comes like an angel visitant."<ref>Charlotte Streifer Rubinstein, 'American Women Sculptors: A History of Women Working in Three Dimensions, Chicago, 1990, pg. 63-66. Cited in "The Bethesda Fountain in New York City", article by Andrew Scott Dolkart in Fountains- Splash and Spectacle, Water and Design from the Renaissance to the Present, by Marilynn Symmes.</ref>  It was criticized by some writers when it was opened in 1873: the New York Times called it "a feebly-pretty idealess thing", but gradually the fountain became a popular favorite, featured in many films and in recent times in Tony Kushner's play Angels in America.

 1900-2000 
Fountains built in the United States between 1900 and 1950 mostly followed European models and classical styles. For example:
The handsome Samuel Francis Dupont Memorial Fountain (aka Dupont Circle Fountain), in Dupont Circle, Washington D.C., was designed and created by Henry Bacon and Daniel Chester French, the architect and sculptor of the Lincoln Memorial, in 1921, in a pure neoclassical style.
The Buckingham Fountain in Grant Park, Chicago was one of the first American fountains to use powerful modern pumps to shoot water as high as  into the air.
The Fountain of Prometheus, with sculpture by Paul Manship, built at Rockefeller Center in New York City in 1933, was the first American fountain in the Art-Deco style.

After World War II, fountains in the United States became more varied in form. Some, like the Vaillancourt Fountain in San Francisco (1971), were pure works of sculpture. The modernist French-Canadian Armand Vaillancourt built his monumental fountain at Embarcadero Plaza in San Francisco in a cubist style, though it was intended as a political statement - the official title is "Quebec Libre!", and the artist was arrested at the time of the opening for painting political slogans on his own fountain.

Other fountains, like the Frankin Roosevelt Memorial Waterfall (1997), by architect Lawrence Halprin, were designed as landscapes to illustrate themes. This fountain is part of the Franklin Delano Roosevelt Memorial in Washington D.C., which has four outdoor "rooms" illustrating FDR's presidency. Each "room" contains a cascade or waterfall; the cascade in the third room illustrates the turbulence of the years of the World War II. Halprin wrote at an early stage of the design; "the whole environment of the memorial becomes sculpture: to touch, feel, hear and contact - with all the senses."

One of the most unusual modern American fountains is the Civil Rights Memorial (1989) at the Southern Poverty Law Center in Montgomery, Alabama, designed by Maya Lin, the designer of the Vietnam Veterans Memorial in Washington D.C. The Civil Rights Memorial fountain features a low elliptical black granite table, with a thin surface of water flowing over the surface, over the inscribed names of civil rights leaders who died, illustrating the quotation from Martin Luther King Jr.:  "...Until justice rolls down like waters and righteousness like a mighty stream."  Visitors are invited to touch the names through the water. "The water is as slow as I could get it," Lin wrote. "It remains very still until you touch it. Your hand carves ripples, which transform and alter the piece, just as reading the words completes the piece."

Significant fountains in the United States

See also
 Drinking fountains in the United States
 Drinking fountains in Philadelphia

Bibliography

Marilyn Symmes (editor),  Fountains-Splash and Spectacle- Water and Design from the Renaissance to the Present.'' Thames and Hudson, in cooperation with the Cooper-Hewitt National Design Museum of the Smithsonian Institution. (1998).

Sources and Citations

Fountains
Fountains in the United States
Architectural history